Pleasure Before Business is a 1927 silent film comedy directed by Frank R. Strayer and starring Max Davidson and Virginia Brown Faire. The film was produced and distributed by then upstart studio Columbia Pictures.

Preserved at the Library of Congress.

Cast
Pat O'Malley as Dr. Burke
Virginia Browne Faire as Ruth Weinberg
Max Davidson as Sam Weinberg
Rosa Rosanova as Sarah Weinberg
Lester Bernard as Morris Fishbein
Tom McGuire as Scotchman
Jack Raymond as Louie
Henri Menjou as Captain

References

External links
 
allmovie/synopsis: Pleasure Before Business

1927 films
Films directed by Frank R. Strayer
Columbia Pictures films
1927 comedy films
Silent American comedy films
American black-and-white films
American silent feature films
1920s American films